General Håkan Erik Gunnar Syrén (born 31 January 1952) is a retired officer of the Swedish Coastal Artillery/Swedish Amphibious Corps and former Chairman of the European Union Military Committee. He was the Supreme Commander of the Swedish Armed Forces from 1 January 2004 to 25 March 2009, and was the first Supreme Commander to come from the Navy.

Early life
Syrén was born in Växjö, Sweden, the son of lieutenant colonel Gunnar Syrén and his wife Siv Syrén. He grew up in Uppsala, where he graduated from Lundellska läroverket in 1970.

Career

Military career
Syrén studied at the Royal Swedish Naval Academy from which he graduated in 1973. He was then instructor and platoon commander at the Vaxholm Coastal Artillery Regiment (KA 1) from 1973 to 1979 and studied at the Military Academy Karlberg in Stockholm from 1980 to 1984. Syrén was a staff officer at the Naval Staff in Stockholm from 1984 to 1988 and was a student at the Naval War College in Newport, Rhode Island, USA from 1988 to 1989. Back in Sweden, he was teacher of strategy at the Military Academy Karlberg from 1989 to 1990 and head of the Planning Department at the Naval Staff from 1990 to 1992. Syrén was then commanding officer of the Marine Amphibious Battalion from 1992 to 1994 and commanding officer of the Vaxholm Coastal Artillery Regiment from 1994 to 1996.

Syrén was head of Operations Planning Department at the Swedish Armed Forces Headquarters from 1996 to 1998. In 1997 he completed a management course at the Swedish Defence University and in 1999 he completed the Senior International Defence Management Course (SIDMC) at the Naval Postgraduate School in Monterey, California, USA. Back in Sweden, Syrén served as secretary to the Defence Commission at the Ministry of Defence in 1999. On 1 October 1999, Syrén was promoted to major general and assumed the position of Director of Military Intelligence and Security at the Swedish Armed Forces Headquarters. He served in this position until 2003.

In 2004, Syrén was appointed Supreme Commander of the Swedish Armed Forces. His appointment lasted until 31 December 2009. On 25 March 2009 he was succeeded by Sverker Göranson as Supreme Commander. On 29 October 2008, the Chiefs of Defence meeting of the European Union Military Committee (EUMC) endorsed Syrén as the next chairman of the EUMC. In the position as CEUMC he was formally appointed by the Council of the European Union for a period of three years and succeeded general Henri Bentégeat on 6 November 2009. His appointment lasted until November 2012 and after this, he started his consulting firm In General AB the same year.

Other work
Syrén was ADC to His Majesty the King from 1988 to 1996. He became a member of the Royal Swedish Society of Naval Sciences in 1993 and of the Royal Swedish Academy of War Sciences in 1996. Syrén became a member of the International Institute for Strategic Studies in 1997 and is a member of the Swedish Society for International Affairs (Utrikespolitiska samfundet). In December 2012 he became a senior advisor to the Swedish Space Corporation (SSC) and the following year he became a board member of the SSC.

Personal life
Syrén is married to Birgitta and together they have three children.

Positions
1973–1979: Instructor and Platoon Commander at the Vaxholm Coastal Artillery Regiment
1980–1984: Student at the Military Academy Karlberg, Stockholm
1984–1988: Staff Officer at the Naval Staff, Stockholm
1988–1989: Student at the Naval War College, Newport, USA
1989–1990: Teacher of Strategy at the Military Academy Karlberg, Stockholm
1990–1992: Head of Planning Department, Naval Staff, Stockholm
1992–1994: Commanding officer of the Marine Amphibious Battalion
1994–1996: Commanding officer of the Vaxholm Coastal Artillery Regiment
1996–1998: Head of Operations Planning Department, Swedish Armed Forces Headquarters
1999–1999: Secretary to the Defence Commission, Ministry of Defence
1999–2003: Director of Military Intelligence and Security, Swedish Armed Forces Headquarters
2004–2009: Supreme Commander of the Swedish Armed Forces
2009–2012: Chairman of the European Union Military Committee

Promotions
Syréns promotions:

1973 – Lieutenant
1976 – Captain
1983 – Major
1988 – Lieutenant colonel
1994 – Colonel
1996 – Senior colonel
1 October 1999 – Major general
2000 – Lieutenant general
2004 – General

Awards and decorations

Swedish
   H. M. The King's Medal, 12th size gold medal worn around the neck on a chain of gold (2009)
   H. M. The King's Medal, 8th size gold (silver-gilt) medal worn on the chest suspended by the Order of the Seraphim ribbon (1994)
   For Zealous and Devoted Service of the Realm
   Home Guard Medal of Merit
   Swedish Women's Voluntary Defence Organization Royal Medal of Merit in gold (22 November 2008)
   Coastal Ranger Association Medal of Merit (Förbundet Kustjägarnas förtjänstmedalj) in silver (2006)

Foreign
   Grand Cross of the Order of the Lion of Finland (2009)
   Grand Cross of the Royal Norwegian Order of Merit (15 April 2009)
   Commander of the Legion of Honour (27 June 2006)

References

1952 births
Living people
Swedish Amphibious Corps generals
Directors of Military Intelligence and Security
Naval Postgraduate School alumni
Naval War College alumni
People from Växjö
Commandeurs of the Légion d'honneur
Members of the Royal Swedish Society of Naval Sciences
Members of the Royal Swedish Academy of War Sciences
20th-century Swedish military personnel
21st-century Swedish military personnel
Chairmen of the European Union Military Committee
Swedish officials of the European Union